Events from the year 1516 in France

Incumbents
 Monarch – Francis I

Events
 

 August 13 – The Treaty of Noyon is signed. Francis I of France recognizes  Charles I of Spain's claim to Naples, and Charles recognizes Francis's claim to Milan.
 August 18 - King Francis I of France and Pope Leo X sign the Concordat of Bologna, agreeing relationships between church and state in France.
 December 4 – Treaty of Brussels: Peace is declared between the Kingdom of France and the Holy Roman Empire.

Births
 
 October 23 – Charlotte of Valois, French princess (d. 1524)

Deaths

See also

References

1510s in France